Asha Agarwal is an Indian former long-distance runner and a recipient of Arjuna Award.

Asha Agarwal won the Hong Kong Marathon on 27 January 1985. In September 1985 she won gold at the Asian Track and Field meet in Jakarta, setting a record of 2 hours 48 minutes and 51 seconds, which still stands. She also won the Freedom Race in Delhi in 1989, Trinidad Marathon in 1986 and has run eight out of 26 marathons below 2 hours 50 minutes.

References 

Year of birth missing (living people)
Living people
Indian female marathon runners
Recipients of the Arjuna Award
Indian female long-distance runners
20th-century Indian women
20th-century Indian people
Athletes (track and field) at the 1986 Asian Games
Place of birth missing (living people)
Asian Games competitors for India